Ramaraogudem is a village in Eluru district of the Indian state of Andhra Pradesh. It is administered under the Eluru revenue division.

Demographics 

 according to the Census of India Ramaraogudem had a population of 1793 of which 897 were male and 896 female. The population of children aged under six years was 199 making up 11.10% of the total population. The literacy rate of the village was 79.36%.

References

Villages in Eluru district